Pinball Legend is a cartoon TV show on CCTV Shaoer Channel (Chinese pronunciation: dan zhu chuan shuo). It is based on five protagonists named Hai Xiaomei, Duo Jieke, Ouyang Xiaofeng, Lei Huo, and Da Li. They fight a vampire ghost named Earl using "Holy Pinball Fighters."
There are 52 episodes, each episode running at 22 minutes long, including the opening theme and the ending theme.

2010 Chinese television series debuts
2010s animated television series
Chinese animated television series
Mandarin-language television shows
China Central Television original programming